Michael P. Leonard (born November 30, 1947 in Paterson,New Jersey) is a retired, Emmy Award winning American television journalist, NYT best-selling author, filmmaker and public speaker. Leonard was a 32-year NBC-TV national network correspondent and regular contributor to the Today Show. He is known for his uniquely creative style and his stories on everyday life.

Works

References

External links
Mike-Leonard.com
Pictureshowfilms.com
Apple Pro/Video interview with Leonard
Audio interview with THECOMMENTARY.CA, April 2006

Footnotes 
1.  G.I. Joe Connection

1947 births
Living people
American television reporters and correspondents
Lake Forest Academy alumni
Providence College alumni
People from Winnetka, Illinois